The Piper PA-34 Seneca  is a twin-engined light aircraft, produced in the United States by Piper Aircraft. It has been in non-continuous production since 1971. The Seneca is primarily used for personal and business flying.

Development
The Seneca was developed as a twin-engined version of the Piper Cherokee Six. The prototype was a Cherokee Six that had wing-mounted engines installed, retaining its nose engine. The prototype was flown as a tri-motor aircraft in the initial stages of the test-flying program.

PA-34-180 Twin Six
With the decision to abandon the three-engined design tested on the PA-32-3M, the PA-34 was developed as a twin-engined aircraft. The prototype PA-34-180 Twin Six, registered as N3401K, first flew on 25 April 1967. The prototype had two  Lycoming O-360 engines, a fixed nosewheel landing gear and a Cherokee Six vertical tail. The second prototype flew on 30 August 1968, still with the  Lycomings but had retractable landing gear and a taller vertical tail. During development flying the wingspan was increased by two feet. The third prototype was closer to the production standard and flew on 20 October 1969; it was fitted with  Lycoming IO-360-A1A engines.

PA-34-200 Seneca
Certified on 7 May 1971 and introduced in late 1971 as a 1972 model, the PA-34-200 Seneca is powered by a pair of Lycoming IO-360-C1E6 engines. The righthand engine is a Lycoming LIO-360-C1E6 engine variant, the "L" in its designation indicating that the crankshaft turns in the opposite direction, giving the Seneca counter-rotating engines. The counter-rotating engines eliminate the critical engine limitations of other light twins and make the aircraft more controllable in the event of a shut down or failure of either engine. A total of 934 Seneca models were built, including one prototype.

PA-34-200T Seneca II

Responding to complaints about the aircraft's handling qualities, Piper introduced the PA-34-200T Seneca II. The aircraft was certified on 18 July 1974 and introduced as a 1975 model.

The new model incorporated changes to the aircraft's control surfaces, including enlarged and balanced ailerons, the addition of a rudder anti-servo tab, and a stabilator bobweight.

The "T" in the new model designation reflected a change to turbocharged, six-cylinder Continental TSIO-360E or EB engines for improved performance, particularly at higher altitudes. The Seneca II retained the counter-rotating engine arrangement of the earlier Seneca I.

The Seneca II also introduced optional "club seating" whereby the two center-row seats face rearwards and the two back seats face forward allowing more legroom in the passenger cabin. A total of 2,588 Seneca IIs were built.

PA-34-220T Seneca III

In 1981, the PA-34-220T Seneca III was introduced, having completed certification on 17 December 1980.

The change in model designation reflected an engine upgrade.

The horsepower increase, with the new engines limit of 2800 rpm (up from 2575 rpm), combined for much improved climb and cruise performance. The new aircraft also incorporated a one-piece windshield and a bare metal instrument panel instead of one covered with a removable plastic fascia. Because of the raised zero-fuel weight and the raised maximum take-off weight, the Seneca III has the highest useful load of all the PA-34 variants. Some later models have electrically-actuated flaps. More than 930 Seneca IIIs were built; the last 37 Seneca IIIs built had a 28-volt electrical system rather than the 14-volt system of previous aircraft.

PA-34-220T Seneca IV
In 1994, the "New" Piper Aircraft company introduced the Seneca IV, having achieved certification on 17 November 1993. This model was similar to the Seneca III offering minor improvements, such as a streamlined engine cowl for increased cruise performance. It continued to use the counter-rotating Continental TSIO-360-KB engines and gross weights remained unchanged. A total of 71 Seneca IVs were built.

PA-34-220T Seneca V

Certified on 11 December 1996, the Seneca V was put into production as a 1997 model year. Again the cowls were redesigned for increased performance, several cockpit switches were relocated from the panel to the headliner, and an improved engine variant, the Continental TSIO-360-RB, fitted with an intercooler, was used.

The standard useful load for the 2014 model is  but typically is  when the aircraft is equipped with air conditioning, deicing equipment and co-pilot instruments.

Embraer EMB-810 Seneca
From 1975 the Seneca was built under licence in Brazil by Embraer as the EMB-810. The PA-34-200T was produced as the EMB-810C Seneca (452 built) and the PA-34-220T as the EMB-810D (228 built).

Operators

Civil
 
The aircraft is popular with air charter companies and small feeder airlines, and is operated by private individuals and companies. One notable civil operator is the Costa Rican Air Surveillance Service.

Military
Brazil
Brazilian Air Force (EMB 810C Seneca)
Colombia
Colombian Air Force
National Army of Colombia
Ecuador
Ecuadorian Air Force
Honduras
Honduran Air Force
Panama
Panamanian Public Forces
Peru
Peruvian Air Force
Serbia
Serbian Air Force (PA-34-220T Seneca V)

Notable accidents and incidents
 On 2 August 1978 a Seneca carrying Richard D. Obenshain home from an election campaign event crashed while attempting a night-time landing at the Chesterfield County Airport (a general aviation airport near Richmond, Virginia), killing Obenshain and the other two people on board.
 On 18 August 2012 a PA-34-200 Seneca crashed off the coast of Masbate, Philippines, killing Philippine Interior and Local Government Secretary Jesse Robredo.

Specifications (PA-34-220T Seneca V)

See also

References
Notes

Bibliography
 English, Adrian J. "Air Power Analysis:Central America and the Caribbean:Panama". World Air Power Journal, Volume 32 Spring 1998. London:Aerospace Publishing. pp. 142–157. . ISSN 0959-7050.
 
 Taylor, John W.R. Jane's All The World's Aircraft 1976-77. London:Jane's Yearbooks, 1976, .
 The New Piper Aircraft, Inc. Piper PA-34-200 Seneca Airplane Service Manual; Manual Part Number 753-817, dated October 30, 2003.
 Westerhuis, Rogier. "Fuerza Aérea Ecuatoriana". Air International, May 2000, Vol. 58, No. 5. pp. 277–281. .
 "World's Air Forces 1988".Flight International, 3 December 1988. pp. 22–87.

External links

The Piper PA-34 Seneca V - Aircraft images and seat map

Seneca
1960s United States civil utility aircraft
Low-wing aircraft
Aircraft first flown in 1967
Twin piston-engined tractor aircraft